Wyne (Own Creator) (born Tun Zaw Win on 22 December 1973) is a film director and screenwriter of Burmese cinema. His career began as a supporting actor in Burmese films. He gained success as a director in the early days of his career by directing music videos. He is best known for directing the short film Ban that Scene.

Biography
Wyne entered the film industry immediately after completing his matriculation exams in 1991. He started his career as a supporting actor in Burmese films. Through hard work, dedication and (to a lesser extent) good looks, directors started to notice him. The first chance to be a supporting actor comes in 1995 and since then Wyne has not looked back. He appeared in various films till 2003. He also took up lessons in script writing from the age of 25 and decided to switch from being an actor to a director by the age of 30. He started with directing MTV sets for Myanmar music, become successful and eventually receive offers from movie producers to direct full-fledged films. However, his real success came in 2011 with his original film Adam, Eve and Datsa. This film lead to the starring actor and actress to be awarded in the Myanmar Motion Picture Academy Awards. The film was shown in Singapore and L.A. and was a major release in Myanmar.

On 17 February 2021, in the aftermath of the 2021 Myanmar coup d'état, authorities issued an arrest warrant for Wyne for encouraging civil servants to join ongoing civil disobedience movement, along with several other celebrities.

Filmography

Film (Cinema)

Frequent actor collaborations

References

1973 births
Living people
Burmese film directors